Worrincy is a surname. Notable people with the surname include: 

Michael Worrincy (born 1986), English rugby player
Rob Worrincy (born 1985), English rugby player